Kevin Kim (born July 26, 1978) is an American retired tennis player.

Career
He entered the top 100 in 2004, reaching a career-high singles ranking of World No. 63 in March 2005. 

In 1993, Kim won the USTA National Boys' 16 Indoor Doubles Championship with Michael Russell.  Kim lost to Russell in the finals of the 1994 USTA National Boys' 16 Singles Championships.  He beat Russell in the finals of the 1994 USTA National Boys' 16 Clay Court Championships, and lost to Russell in the finals of the 1994 Easter Bowl Boys' 16s Championships.

In 1995, he lost to Russell in the finals of the USTA National Boys’ 18 Clay Court Championships.  Kim reached the second round in singles and the quarterfinals in doubles with Russell at the 1995 Australian Open Junior Championships.

In 1996, he won the doubles title with Russell at the 1996 Asuncion Bowl in Asuncion, Paraguay.  At the 1996 USTA National Boys’ 18 Championships, he lost in the doubles final with Russell to Bob and Mike Bryan.  He was a doubles quarterfinalist with Russell at the 1996 Wimbledon junior championships. 

Kim reached the third round of the 2005 Australian Open, and won 9 Challenger titles in his career.

Performance timelines

Singles

Doubles

ATP Tour career finals

Doubles: 1 (1 runner-up)

ATP Challenger and ITF Futures finals

Singles: 21 (9–12)

ATP Challenger and ITF Futures finals

Doubles: 12 (5–7)

References

External links 
 
 Kevin Kim Recent Match Results
 Kevin Kim World Ranking History
 

1978 births
Living people
American male tennis players
Sportspeople from Torrance, California
American people of Korean descent
Tennis people from California
UCLA Bruins men's tennis players